State Route 132 (SR 132) is a primary state highway in the U.S. state of Virginia.  Known for most of its length as Henry Street, the state highway runs  from SR 199 in Williamsburg north to SR 143 in York County near Williamsburg.  SR 132 is the main north–south highway through the independent city of Williamsburg.  The state highway is also, via SR 143, the primary access road to Colonial Williamsburg, The College of William & Mary, and Colonial Parkway from Interstate 64 (I-64).

Route description

SR 132 begins at an intersection with SR 199 (Humelsine Parkway) at the southern edge of the city of Williamsburg.  The intersection is just west of SR 199's interchange with Colonial Parkway, which is unsigned SR 90003.  SR 132 also has a connection with the parkway just north of the SR 199 intersection.  The state highway heads north as two-lane undivided Henry Street, which crosses Paper Mill Creek and passes through a forested area before reaching the southern edge of downtown Williamsburg, where the highway passes the William & Mary School of Law and the National Center for State Courts.  North of the DeWitt Wallace Decorative Arts Museum, SR 132 intersects SR 5 (Francis Street).  The two highways run concurrently north between Colonial Williamsburg to the east and both the modern downtown of Williamsburg and the College of William & Mary to the west.  SR 132 and SR 5 have a junction with Duke of Gloucester Street, once the main east–west street of the city but is now a pedestrian street through Colonial Williamsburg.

At the north end of downtown Williamsburg, just east of the Williamsburg Transportation Center serving Amtrak's Northeast Regional train, SR 132 intersects Lafayette Street, onto which SR 5 heads east.  After the state highway's at-grade intersection with CSX's Peninsula Subdivision, Henry Street splits to the north as an unnumbered city street and SR 132 veers northeast through a forested area.  The state highway intersects SR 132Y at a directional intersection.  SR 132Y is a  spur that connects SR 132 with the Colonial Williamsburg Visitors Center and with Colonial Parkway.  SR 132 expands to a four-lane divided highway at the SR 132Y junction, crosses the boundary between the city of Williamsburg and York County and has an intersection with U.S. Route 60 (Bypass Road) before reducing to a two-lane undivided road.  The state highway crosses Queen Creek before reaching its northern terminus at SR 143 (Merrimac Trail), which provides access to I-64.

Major intersections

References

External links

Virginia Highways Project: VA 132

132
State Route 132
State Route 132